Andrei Ionuț Cerlincă (born 6 August 1995) is a Romanian footballer who plays as a midfielder.

References

External links
 
 

1995 births
Living people
Sportspeople from Suceava
Romanian footballers
Association football midfielders
Liga I players
Liga II players
ACS Foresta Suceava players
FC Rapid București players
FC Brașov (1936) players